Saint Juvenal was a bishop of Jerusalem from about 422. In 451, on the See of Jerusalem being recognised as a Patriarchate by the Council of Chalcedon, he became the first Patriarch of Jerusalem, an office he occupied until his death in 458.

Background
After the Siege of Jerusalem in AD 70 the city had been left in ruins, and after Hadrian's visit to the site in 135, a new Roman city was built, called Ælia Capitolina (Ælius was Hadrian's family nomen). Ælia was a town of little importance in the empire; the governor of the province resided at Caesarea. Caesarea became the metropolitan see; the Bishop of Ælia (Jerusalem) was merely one of its suffragans.

Life
Juvenal wanted to make Jerusalem into a patriarchate, but Patriarch Cyril of Alexandria and Pope Leo I opposed the separation of Jerusalem from Cæsarea and Antioch.

In 429, Patriarch Juvenal consecrated the Laura of Euthymius, located on the road between Jerusalem and Jericho, and supplied it with presbyters and deacons.

In 431, Juvenal sided with Cyril against Nestorius at the First Council of Ephesus.

In 449, Juvenal was one of the leaders of the Second Council of Ephesus, being the first to sign it. This led to his name being removed from the diptychs of the churches that rejected the council. However he changed his stance at the Council of Chalcedon convened later, condemning the previous council.

In 451, the Fourth Ecumenical Council met in the city of Chalcedon. It condemned the Monophysite heresy, which taught that the human nature in Christ was totally absorbed by the divine nature. Juvenal was among those who condemned the heresy and affirmed the doctrine of the union of two natures in Jesus Christ, the divine and the human, without separation and without mixture. When Dioscorus of Alexandria was tried for violation of canonical law, Juvenal voted for his condemnation. The attenders of the council consented to the establishment of the patriarchate of Jerusalem, but when Juvenal returned to his throne, Monophysites drove him from it and installed Theodosius as the patriarch. Theodosius reportedly filled Jerusalem with blood, then raised a military company to punish other rivals in the region like Severianus, Bishop of Scythopolis, whom he brutally executed in 452 or 453 AD. Imperial troops restored Juvenal in 453, and he served in peace until his death in 458.

Canonisation
Juvenal is regarded as a saint in the Eastern Orthodox Church with his feast day celebrated on July 2.

References

Further reading

458 deaths
Saints from the Holy Land
5th-century Christian saints
5th-century bishops of Jerusalem
Juvenal
Year of birth unknown